Cabot Beach Provincial Park is a provincial park in Prince Edward Island, Canada. It is located in Malpeque Bay.

Cabot Beach is the largest park in western PEI. This beautiful park has a large day-use area with playground equipment, an activity centre with children's programs and a naturalist on staff who provides guided nature walks. There is also supervised swimming on scenic Malpeque Bay.

Cabot Beach was host to the 4th (1977) and the 10th (2001) Canadian Scout Jamboree.

References 

Provincial parks of Prince Edward Island
Parks in Prince County, Prince Edward Island